The Nib Literary Award, established in 2002 at the suggestion of actor and producer Chris Haywood, the Patron of the Friends of Waverley Library, as The Nib Waverley Library Award for Literature and since 2017 known as Mark and Evette Moran Nib Award for Literature (or Mark and Evette Moran Nib Literary Award), is an Australian literary award for works in any genre, awarded annually at Waverley Library in Sydney. It is also known as 'The Nib': CAL Waverley Library Award for Literature.

Organised and supported by Waverley Council, the award recognises "excellence in literary research", and books in any genre and either non-fiction or fiction are considered for it. There are cash prizes for the winning and shortlisted books, with each of the shortlisted authors also earning the Alex Buzo Prize.

In 2017, the Nib was renamed the Mark and Evette Moran Nib Award for Literature, and three new categories were added: the People's Choice, the Alex Buzo shortlist prize, and a Military History Prize.

The main sponsors were Mark and Evette Moran of Vaucluse.

Winners

References

Australian literary awards
Awards established in 2002
Recurring events established in 2002
2002 establishments in Australia